Todd Dewberry Weiner (born September 16, 1975 in Bristol, Pennsylvania) is a former American football offensive tackle of the National Football League. He was drafted by the Seattle Seahawks in the second round of the 1998 NFL Draft. He played college football at Kansas State.

Weiner also played for the Atlanta Falcons.

References 

1975 births
Living people
People from Bristol, Pennsylvania
Players of American football from Pennsylvania
American football offensive tackles
Kansas State Wildcats football players
Seattle Seahawks players
Atlanta Falcons players
J. P. Taravella High School alumni
Sportspeople from Coral Springs, Florida